Ferki Aliu Stadium, is a multi-use stadium in Vushtrri, Kosovo. It is currently used for football matches and is the home ground of KF Vushtrria of the Kosovar Superliga. The stadium holds 6,000 people.

References

External links
Stadium information

Vucitrn
KF Vushtrria
Sport in Vushtrri